Mattea Julia Meyer (born 9 November 1987 in Basel; resident in Villmergen and Opfikon) is a Swiss politician, a member of the Swiss National Council and co-president of the Swiss Social Democratic Party.

Early life and education 
Mattea Meyer was born in Basel, but her family moved to Winterthur in Canton Zurich. She studied history, geography and political science at the University of Zurich between 2007 and 2015. She obtained a MSc in Human and Economic Geography from the University of Zurich in 2015. During her studies, she stayed for one semester at the University of Aix-Marseille where she experienced protests by the professors and students of the University.

Political career 
From 2009 to 2013 she was Vice-President of the Young Socialists of Switzerland. From 2011 to 2015 she was a member of the Grand Council of the Canton of Zurich. In 2015 she was re-elected in her constituency with the best result of her party, but in April 2015, the cantonal party nominated her as a candidate for the 2015 National Council elections. Since the 30 November 2015, she represents the SP in the National Council of Switzerland and resigned as a cantonal councilor. In her first legislature in the National Council she was a member of the Finance Commission and the Immunity Commission of the National Council. In the parliamentary elections in 2019, Meyer was re-elected as a national councilor. In her second legislature she took a seat in the commission for health and social security (SGK) and remained in the immunity commission. In December 2019 Meyer announced that together with Cédric Wermuth, she would be a candidate for the presidency of the SP Switzerland. Succeeding Christian Levrat, they were elected on 17 October 2020.

Political positions 
She is a leftwing politician and sees the SP much more defending so called left politics than the European Social Democratic sister parties of the SP. She promotes a welcoming approach towards the asylum seekers which she sees as a normal answer for a country which exports weapons to war zones. During the COVID-19 pandemic she demanded that the Federal and Cantonal (provincial) Governments  announce their measures in a coordinated manner. She defends the liberty of expression and assumed a godparenthood of the Belarusian political activist Anastasiya Mirontsava.

Personal life 
Mattea Meyer is the partner of fellow SP politician Patrick Kistler. The couple have two children, a daughter born in 2017 and in 2021.

References 

1987 births
21st-century Swiss women politicians
21st-century Swiss politicians
Living people
Members of the National Council (Switzerland)
Social Democratic Party of Switzerland politicians
University of Zurich alumni
Politicians from Basel-Stadt